ISO/TC 46 is Technical Committee 46 of the International Organization for Standardization (ISO), responsible for Information and documentation.

Overview 
The scope of the committee is 'standardization of practices relating to libraries, documentation and information centres, publishing, archives, records management, museum documentation, indexing and abstracting services, and information science'.

Leadership 
The Technical Committee Chair for term 2018-2022 is Gaëlle Béquet, from France, who is currently in her second term as chairperson (the first was 2014-2017).

Françoise Pellé, also french, served as Chair of the ISO/TC 46 from 2008 to 2014.

Subcommittees 
Most work of the Technical Committee is done by Subcommittees (SC) dealing with a particular field. The Subcommittees are:

 ISO/TC 46/SC 2: Conversion of written languages (Inactive)
 ISO/TC 46/SC 3: Terminology of information and documentation (Inactive)
 ISO/TC 46/SC 4: Technical interoperability
 ISO/TC 46/SC 5: Monolingual and multilingual thesauri and related indexing practices (Inactive)
 ISO/TC 46/SC 6: Bibliographic data elements in manual and machine systems (Inactive)
 ISO/TC 46/SC 7: Presentation of publications (Inactive)
 ISO/TC 46/SC 8: Quality - Statistics and performance evaluation
 ISO/TC 46/SC 9: Identification and description
 ISO/TC 46/SC 10: Requirements for document storage and conditions for preservation
 ISO/TC 46/SC 11: Archives/records management

See also 
 List of ISO Technical Committees

References

External links 
http://www.collectionscanada.gc.ca/iso/tc46sc9/
https://web.archive.org/web/20080914090731/http://www.niso.org/international/sc9/ (Secretariat on behalf of ANSI)
Technical Committee at iso.org
standards in iso.org catalogue
projects